The Beriev A-60 is a Soviet/Russian airborne laser laboratory aircraft based on the Ilyushin Il-76MD transport.

In the 1970s a special aviation complex was established by the Soviets at Taganrog machine-building factory to develop airborne laser technology for the Soviet military.

In 1977 Beriev OKB started the design of a flying laboratory designated '1А'. The  purpose was to solve the complex scientific and engineering problems regarding the creation of an airborne laser and also to facilitate research on the distribution of beams in the top layers of an atmosphere. Work on this topic occurred with wide cooperation between the enterprises and the scientific organizations of the USSR, but the basic partner OKB was TsKB Almaz headed by B.V. Bunkin.

Design and development
The Il-76MD was selected as the base aircraft for the flying laboratory. To accommodate the laser many changes were made to the basic IL-76 design, which drastically changed the appearance of the plane.

 In front, instead of the regular nosecone, it was fitted with a steerable beam director turret for targeting lidar (twenty years later, Boeing used a similar concept in the YAL-1 test platform, although for the main laser, not targeting).
 A large retractable dorsal turret was installed for main laser firing, as engineers found it impossible to fit the main laser aiming optics into the nosecone turret.
 Two large nacelles were installed along the lower edge of the fuselage. One housed the turbo generators used to power the laser, and another replaced the "chin" cabin, housing the targeting lidar's APU.
 The rear cargo doors were removed, although the ramp was retained, as it was a structural element.
 The tail gunner position was removed.

The problem of accommodating the laser gun was therefore solved and it did not spoil the aerodynamics of the base aircraft. The laser system was 1 MW, created by one of the branches of the Institute of Atomic Energy, Kurchatov. This carbon dioxide laser was developed for installation on the IL-76.

The '1A' flying laboratory first flew on 19 August 1981 under E.A. Lakhmostov.

On 29 August 1991, the crew led by test pilot V.P. Demyanovskiy flew the second flying laboratory which received the name '1А2' СССР-86879. A new variant of a laser system was installed as a result of tests on '1А'.

Apparently, after being mothballed for more than 15 years, the project was reactivated in May 2009, according to the eyewitness accounts about an A-60 spotted flying in the Rostov on Don and Taganrog regions.  It is now parked at Taganrog airport.  47°11'53.92"N  38°51'46.05"E

Russia has developed a military airborne laser mounted in a A-60, designated 1LK222 Sokol Eshelon. The second A-60 laboratory can be seen at this reference.

Operators

Soviet Air Force
 Russia
Russian Air Force

See also
Related development:
 Ilyushin Il-76
 Sokol Eshelon

Comparable aircraft:
 Boeing NC-135
 Boeing YAL-1

References

External links

 A-60 description in Russian.
 A-60 - "laser sword of USSR", or "30 years before laser Boeing" in Russian
 A-60 in Russian
 https://web.archive.org/web/20110901023846/http://russianplanes.net/EN/ID43995
 Beriev A-60

A-60
1980s Soviet special-purpose aircraft
Military lasers
Science and technology in the Soviet Union
High-wing aircraft
T-tail aircraft
Quadjets
Aircraft first flown in 1981